The 2006 Billboard Music Awards were held December 4, 2006 at the MGM Grand Garden Arena in Las Vegas, Nevada. The awards recognized the most popular artists and albums from 2006.

Performances

Winners and nominees
Winners are listed in bold.

Artists with multiple wins and nominations

References

2006
Billboard awards
2006 in American music
2006 in Nevada
2006 music awards
MGM Grand Garden Arena